Zofiówka may refer to:
Zofiówka, Russian Trochenbrod, a Polish Jewish shtetl, now located in Ukraine
Sofiyivsky Park in central Ukraine
Zofiówka, Grajewo County in Podlaskie Voivodeship (north-east Poland)
Zofiówka, Mońki County in Podlaskie Voivodeship (north-east Poland)
Zofiówka, Bełchatów County in Łódź Voivodeship (central Poland)
Zofiówka, Łódź East County in Łódź Voivodeship (central Poland)
Zofiówka, Lublin Voivodeship (east Poland)
Zofiówka, Busko County in Świętokrzyskie Voivodeship (south-central Poland)
Zofiówka, Staszów County in Świętokrzyskie Voivodeship (south-central Poland)
Zofiówka, Grójec County in Masovian Voivodeship (east-central Poland)
Zofiówka, Lipsko County in Masovian Voivodeship (east-central Poland)
Zofiówka, Płock County in Masovian Voivodeship (east-central Poland)
Zofiówka, Sochaczew County in Masovian Voivodeship (east-central Poland)
Zofiówka, Greater Poland Voivodeship (west-central Poland)
Zofiówka, Warmian-Masurian Voivodeship (north Poland)
Zofiówka, coal mine in Jastrzębie-Zdrój, Poland
Zofiówka, former colony, in the Wodzisław State country